The Hutt Valley Firehawks were a New Zealand rugby league club that represented Hutt Valley in the Lion Red Cup from 1994 to 1996. In 1995 their nickname was shortened to "Hawks" and 1996 they were known as the Hutt Valley Dolphins.

The Wainuiomata Lions were the main feeder club.

Notable players
Notable players included Zane Clark, Paul Howell, Peter Edwards and Denvour Johnston.

Season Results

References

Defunct rugby league teams in New Zealand
Sport in Lower Hutt
Sport in Upper Hutt
Rugby league in Wellington
Rugby clubs established in 1994
1994 establishments in New Zealand
1996 disestablishments in New Zealand
Hutt Valley